An annual report is a comprehensive report on a company's activities throughout the preceding year. Annual reports are intended to give shareholders and other interested people information about the company's activities and financial performance. They may be considered as grey literature. Most jurisdictions require companies to prepare and disclose annual reports, and many require the annual report to be filed at the company's registry. Companies listed on a stock exchange are also required to report at more frequent intervals (depending upon the rules of the stock exchange involved).

Content
Typical annual reports may include:

 General corporate information
 Operating and financial review
 Director's Report
 Corporate governance information
 Chairpersons statement
 Auditor's report
 Sustainability and ESG information
 Contents: non-audited information
 Financial statements, including
 Balance sheet also known as Statement of Financial Position
 Income statement also known as profit and loss statement. 
 Statement of changes in equity
 Cash flow statement
 Notes to the financial statements
 Accounting policies
 Independent assurance statements
 Other features

Other information deemed relevant to stakeholders may be included, such as a report on operations for manufacturing firms or corporate social responsibility reports for companies with environmentally  or socially sensitive operations. In the case of larger companies, it is usually a sleek, colorful, high-gloss publication.

The details provided in the report are of use to investors to understand the company's financial position and future direction. The financial statements are usually compiled in compliance with IFRS and/or the domestic GAAP, as well as domestic legislation (e.g. the SOX in the U.S.).

In the United States, a more-detailed version of the report, called a Form 10-K, is submitted to the U.S. Securities and Exchange Commission. A publicly held company may also issue a much more limited version of an annual report, which is known as a "wrap report." A wrap report is a Form 10-K with an annual report cover wrapped around it.

Directors' Role

Statement of Directors' responsibilities for the shareholders' financial statements

The Directors are responsible for preparing the Annual Report and the financial statements in accordance with applicable Law of the Republic of Ireland, including the accounting standards issued by the Accounting Standards Board and published by The Institute of Chartered Accountants. Irish company law requires the directors to prepare financial statements for each financial period which give a true and fair view of the state of affairs of the company and of the profit or loss of the company for that period.

In preparing these financial statements, the Directors are required to:

 select suitable accounting policies and then apply them consistently
 make judgements and estimates that are reasonable and prudent
 prepare the financial statements on the going concern basis unless it is inappropriate to presume that the Company will continue in business

The directors confirm that they have complied with the above requirements in preparing the financial statements. The directors are responsible for keeping proper books of account that disclose with reasonable accuracy at any time the financial position of the company and to enable them to ensure that the financial statements are prepared in accordance with accounting standards generally accepted in Ireland and with Irish statute comprising the Companies Acts 1963 to 2009...

History 
In 1903, US Steel published an annual report whose financial accuracy was certified by Price, Waterhouse & Co in what is known as the earliest modern corporate annual report.

'Alternative' annual reports 
Certain groups such as The True Cost Of Chevron Network have released 'alternative' annual reports as a way to highlight ongoing environmental destruction and/or human rights abuses committed by a particular company.

See also
Form 10-K, the basic information required by the US Securities and Exchange Commission
US corporate law
Green annual report
Grey literature

References

External links

 How to Efficiently Read an Annual Report
 "How to Read a 10-K Like Warren Buffett" by CNBC
 What are some of the key inclusions in an Annual Report?
 Database of digital Annual and Integrated Reports
 Archive of Annual Reports, Internet Archive
 Annual Report Design Trends by reportyak.com

Financial statements
Grey literature
Annual publications
Reports